Colette Bryce is a poet, freelance writer, and editor. She was a Fellow in Creative Writing at the University of Dundee from 2003 to 2005, and a North East Literary Fellow at the University of Newcastle upon Tyne from 2005 to 2007. She was the Poetry Editor of Poetry London from 2009 to 2013. In 2019 Bryce succeeded Eavan Boland as editor of Poetry Ireland Review.

Early life
Bryce was born in Derry, Northern Ireland, where she was educated at Thornhill College. Bryce lived in London until 2002 when she moved to Scotland.  She moved to the North East of England in 2005.

Works
Bryce's first published work was included in the 1995 volume Anvil New Poets, ed. Carol Ann Duffy, which also introduced the work of poets Kate Clanchy and Alice Oswald, among others. That year she won an Eric Gregory Award.  Her poetry appears in the recent anthologies Modern Women Poets (Bloodaxe), and The New Irish Poets (Bloodaxe), Forward Book of Poetry 2009 (Forward), Hand in Hand (Faber) and the Penguin Book of Irish Poetry (Penguin, 2010).

Her first collection The Heel of Bernadette, published in 2000 by Picador, won the Aldeburgh Poetry Festival Prize and the Strong Award (now known as the Strong/Shine Award) for new Irish poets.

In 2003, Bryce won the National Poetry Competition for her poem, The Full Indian Rope Trick, which became the title-poem of her 2004 collection, short-listed for the TS Eliot Award the following year.

A pamphlet, The Observations of Aleksandr Svetlov, appeared from Donut Press in 2007.

Her third collection Self-Portrait in the Dark was published in 2008 and shortlisted for the Poetry Now Award in 2009. It includes the poem Self-Portrait in a Broken Wing-Mirror that won the Academi Cardiff International Poetry Competition in 2007.

In 2010, she received a Cholmondely Award for poets from the Society of Authors.

A pamphlet ″Ballasting the Ark″, written in response to a Leverhulme fellowship at Dove Marine Laboratory in Cullercoats, was shortlisted for the Ted Hughes Award for new work in poetry in 2012.

Her 2014 collection ″The Whole & Rain-domed Universe″, which draws on the author's experience of growing up in Derry during the Troubles, was awarded a special Christopher Ewart-Biggs Award in memory of Seamus Heaney.  The book was also short-listed for Forward Prize for Best Poetry Collection, The Costa Poetry Award, and The Roehampton Poetry Prize.

“Selected Poems” was awarded the Pigott Prize for Irish poetry in 2017.

Her collection “The M Pages” was published by Picador in 2020.

Bibliography
The Heel of Bernadette (Picador 2000)
The Full Indian Rope Trick (Picador 2004)
The Observations of Aleksandr Svetlov (pamphlet Donut 2007)
Ink on Paper: Poetry and Art (ed. Mudfog 2007)
Self-Portrait in the Dark (Picador 2008)
"Ballasting the Ark" (pamphlet NCLA 2012)
"The Whole & Rain-domed Universe" (Picador 2014)
Selected Poems (Picador 2017)
The M pages (Picador 2020)

References

External links
Colette Bryce reads on PoetCasting
 Colette Bryce's Poems
Reviews

20th-century British women writers
20th-century Irish women writers
20th-century Irish writers
20th-century poets from Northern Ireland
21st-century British poets
21st-century British women writers
21st-century Irish poets
21st-century Irish women writers
21st-century Irish writers
21st-century writers from Northern Ireland
British LGBT poets
Living people
Writers from Derry (city)
Women poets from Northern Ireland
21st-century women writers from Northern Ireland
20th-century women writers from Northern Ireland
21st-century LGBT people from Northern Ireland
Year of birth missing (living people)